It Never Goes Out is the debut studio album by the American rock band The Hotelier. It was originally released on January 2, 2011 and later re-released in 2015 after the band was signed by the Carolina-based record label Tiny Engines.

Release
Following their founding in 2009, the group released a two-song demo and a short EP titled We Are All Alone under the name The Hotel Year. The releases didn't draw much attention outside of the band's home state of Massachusetts.

The debut full length was written when all of the band's members were in their late teens. It was recorded in 2010 and released on January 2, 2011. After the success of their second LP, titled Home, Like Noplace Is There, the record was re-released in early 2015 with a different album cover.

This is the band's only full length with guitarist/vocalist Zack Shaw, who left the group in 2012. He was replaced by Cody Millett.

Track listing

Personnel
 Christian Holden – vocals, bass
 Zack Shaw – guitar, vocals
 Chris Hoffman – guitar
 Sam Frederick – drums

References

2011 albums
The Hotelier albums
Tiny Engines albums